Relicina is a genus of foliose lichens belonging to the large family Parmeliaceae. It contains 59 species.

Taxonomy
Relicina was originally conceived as a series of the large genus Parmelia by lichenologists Mason Hale and Syo Kurokawa in 1964. A decade later, they promoted it to the status of genus.

The genus Relicinopsis, proposed by Australian lichenologists John Elix and Doug Verdon in 1986 as a segregate of Pseudoparmelia, was shown to be nested within Relicina in a 2017 molecular phylogenetics study.

Species
 Relicina abstrusa 
 Relicina amphithrix 
 Relicina barringtonensis 
 Relicina circumnodata 
 Relicina clarkensis 
 Relicina colombiana 
 Relicina conglutinata 
 Relicina connivens 
 Relicina dahlii 
 Relicina demethylbarbatica 
 Relicina dentata 
 Relicina diederichii 
 Relicina eumorpha 
 Relicina filsonii 
 Relicina intertexta 
 Relicina kurandensis 
 Relicina limbata 
 Relicina malaccensis 
 Relicina planiuscula 
 Relicina polycarpa 
 Relicina rahengensis 
 Relicina ramboldii 
 Relicina ramosissima 
 Relicina relicinula 
 Relicina samoensis 
 Relicina schizospatha 
 Relicina stevensiae 
 Relicina subabstrusa 
 Relicina subcoronata 
 Relicina sublanea 
 Relicina subnigra 
 Relicina sydneyensis 
 Relicina terricrocodila

References

Parmeliaceae
Lichen genera
Lecanorales genera
Taxa described in 1964
Taxa named by Mason Hale
Taxa named by Syo Kurokawa